Gleasonia is a genus of plants in the Rubiaceae. There are at the present time (May 2014) five accepted species, all native to South America.

Gleasonia cururuensis Egler - Brazil
Gleasonia duidana Standl. - Brazil, Venezuela, Guyana
Gleasonia duidana var. duidana - Brazil, Venezuela
Gleasonia duidana var. latifolia Steyerm. - Brazil, Venezuela, Guyana
Gleasonia macrocalyx Ducke - Brazil
Gleasonia prancei B.M.Boom  - Brazil
Gleasonia uaupensis Ducke  - Brazil

References

Rubiaceae genera
Henriquezieae